Heliconisa is a monotypic moth genus in the family Saturniidae erected by Francis Walker in 1855. Its single species, Heliconisa pagenstecheri, was first described by Carl Geyer in 1835.

References

Hemileucinae
Monotypic moth genera